Estádio Municipal Arsénio Ramos is a multi-use stadium in Boa Vista, Cape Verde  used for both football and athletics. Its location is northeast of the town center south of the town perimeter road, a bypass connecting the port and places in the east and south of the island. It is at the urban limit and close to the island's industrial area located in the east and former salt mines to the west along with its beach and its newly built hotels and villas. It is currently used mostly for football matches and is the home stadium of Académica Operária, Sal-Rei, Sanjoanense and Sporting. The stadium holds 500 people.

The stadium was first opened on February 9, 2008.

Before the stadium opened, the football (soccer) field was in the western end of the city next to the port and the Atlantic.  A basketball court later built on the former space and recently small residential complexes has been built on the site.

The Boa Vista Regional Athletics Association has its own championships, regional competitions takes place every season.

See also
List of buildings and structures in Boa Vista, Cape Verde
List of football stadiums in Cape Verde

References 

Athletics (track and field) venues in Cape Verde
Ramos Arsenio
Sports venues completed in 2008
Sal Rei
Ramos Arsenio
Académica Operária
Sport Sal Rei Club